Jonathan Slavin (born November 8, 1969) is an American actor and activist.

Early life
Slavin was born in Camp Lejeune, North Carolina and raised in Wilkes-Barre, Pennsylvania.

Career
Slavin portrayed illustrator Byron Togler on the Fox network's sitcom Andy Richter Controls the Universe, Ogo on the CGI animated show Robot and Monster, and scientist Phil Myman on ABC's sitcom Better Off Ted. He appeared as a member the main cast of Dr. Ken  and The Republic of Sarah and as a recurring character on  Speechless and Santa Clarita Diet.

Slavin has also had guest roles on series such as Dharma & Greg, Castle, Grey's Anatomy, My Name Is Earl, Summerland, Friends, Grimm, Weeds, Wings, ER, Chicago Hope, Ugly Betty, CSI: Crime Scene Investigation, Bones, Better with You, Raising Hope, The Finder, Grace and Frankie and Friends with Better Lives.

He has also appeared in such feature films as Free Enterprise, Race to Witch Mountain, Backwoods, A Cinderella Story, Dirty Girl, and Love & Mercy.

In January 2023, he returned to the stage in ''Home Front.

Personal life
Slavin is Jewish. He is gay  and in July 2016 he married his partner of 22 years. He is also a vegan and animal rights activist, with a large menagerie of adopted pets.

References

External links
 

1969 births
Living people
Male actors from Pennsylvania
American male film actors
American male television actors
American male voice actors
American gay actors
Jewish American male actors
20th-century American male actors
21st-century American male actors
LGBT Jews
Actors from Wilkes-Barre, Pennsylvania
LGBT people from North Carolina
People from Camp Lejeune, North Carolina
21st-century American Jews